Tiberiu Popoviciu High School of Computer Science is located at 140–142 Calea Turzii in Cluj-Napoca, Romania.

The high school was founded in 1971, together with three other similar high schools in Bucharest, Iași, and Timișoara. Since 1993 it holds the name of mathematician Tiberiu Popoviciu (1906–1975), known for establishing the academic field of computer science in Romania.

References

External links
 Official site

Educational institutions established in 1971
Schools in Cluj-Napoca
High schools in Romania
1971 establishments in Romania